Line 3 (Officially: North-South Line, Metro 3 or M3, and unofficially: Blue Line) is the third and longest line of the Budapest Metro. It runs in a general north-south direction parallel to the Danube on the Pest side, roughly following Váci út south from Újpest to the city center, then following the route of Üllői út southeast to Kőbánya-Kispest. Its daily ridership is estimated at 500,000. Like Line 1, it does not serve Buda.

History

The first decree for the third line was made in 1968. Construction started in 1970, and the first section was opened in 1976 with six stations. Soviet-made 81-717/714 carriages (as in many Eastern Bloc metro systems) operate on this line. Operation started with 4-car trains in 1976, expanded to 6-car trains in 1984. Six-car trains provide space for 1,097 people. It was planned for a daily ridership of 800,000 people.

Line 3 runs in a north-south direction (more exactly, from north-northeast to southeast) through the city and connects several populous microraion with the downtown. It has a transfer station with Line 1 and Line 2 at Deák Ferenc tér, and a transfer station for Line 4 at Kálvin tér.

Ongoing reconstruction

The Mayor of Budapest Gábor Demszky was warned in 2006 by BKV that the line would soon need reconstruction, but no steps towards this were made before the new mayor István Tarlós took office in 2010. Some trains were prone to burning or smoking issues, but this has caused neither fatalities nor serious injuries so far. Tarlós reacted by ordering the retirement of all trains that were more than 40 years old. He also started the reconstruction of the tracks, because they were reported as hazardous. In 2014 the mayor's administration published the plans for the complete reconstruction of the line and Viktor Orbán's government allowed the local government to finance the reconstruction of the trains by taking up loans. Repayment of the loans was guaranteed by the national government in case the municipal government was not able to pay. The municipal government requested EU funds to finance the reconstruction of the underground infrastructure (tunnels and stations), and the national government guaranteed that it would provide additional financing in case insufficient EU funds were obtained.

In January 2016 the first train for reconstruction was handed over to the Russian Metrowagonmash (the original manufacturer). Tarlós had preferred buying new trains, but was overruled by the Orbán government. The prototype of the reconstructed trains entered service on 20 March 2017. From then on, the number of reconstructed trains serving the line was scheduled to increase by 2 trains every month.

On 4 September 2017 contracts for reconstructing the tunnel and stations of the northern section were signed. The stations were to be finished by 31 December 2018 but in fact they were only reopened on 30 March 2019. The reconstruction of the southern section (Népliget – Kőbánya–Kispest) was started on 6 April 2019. On 22 October 2020 the southern, renovated section of Metro 3 was handed over. The Népliget station has become barrier-free, in 2021 Pöttyös utca and Ecseri út will also be barrier-free. The plan is to upgrade the metro at Arany János utca and Ferenciek tere from 9 March 2020, and from July 2020 at Corvin Negyed and Semmelweis Klinikák stations. Reconstruction between the Nyugati Pályaudvar and Semmelweis klinikák will begin after the southern section has been commissioned. At these stops, the underground trains pass non-stop while work continues. Overhauling the tunnel is set to be completed by 24 August 2020. After this reconstruction, the renewed trains will probably stay in service for more than 20 years before having to be replaced.

Criticism

Civil groups voiced their concerns over the lack of accessibility and air-conditioning. In response, Tarlós promised modular AC units would be installed on the trains and the government agreed to make all 20 stations accessible.

Timeline

Reconstructions

Rolling stock

Stations and connections

1Free-barrier only the Tram line 1. On 30 January 2020 the Árpád híd metro station was renamed Göncz Árpád városközpont.

2By the end of 2023, the section between the surface and the metro station will also be barrier-free.

Gallery

References

Budapest Metro lines
Railway lines opened in 1976